Shwa Losben is an American singer/songwriter who was the front-man of the Washington, D.C.-based band "Shwa".

Born Joshua Losben, he resides in San Francisco and frequently tours. In 2008, he won the ASCAP Robert Allen Songwriting Award named after American composer Robert Allen.

Discography

External links
 Artist Website
 iTunes
 Spotify

References

American singer-songwriters
Living people
Year of birth missing (living people)